Guoyuan Subdistrict is a subdistrict located in the Miyun District of Beijing, China. It is located in the west bank of Bai River. The subdistrict borders Miyun Town to the north, Gulou Subdistrict to the east, and Shilipu Town to the southwest. Its total population was 88,764 as of 2020.

The subdistrict was created out of portions of Miyun Town in 2005. Its name literally means "Orchard".

Administrative divisions 
In the year 2021, Guoyuan Subdistrict consisted of these 18 communities:

See also 
 List of township-level divisions of Beijing

References

Subdistricts of Beijing
Miyun District